George Carson (8 March 1925 – 1989) was a Scottish footballer who played for Raith Rovers and Dumbarton.

Carson died in Dumbarton in 1989, at the age of 64.

References

1925 births
1989 deaths
Scottish footballers
Dumbarton F.C. players
Raith Rovers F.C. players
Scottish Football League players
Association football forwards